Live in Montreux 69 is a live album by English rock band Deep Purple, recorded 4 October 1969 in Montreux, released in 2006. It was recorded in the Montreux Casino that burned down two years later.

It featured some of the first performances of "Speed King" and "Child in Time", which were released on Deep Purple in Rock eight months later. The live version of "Kentucky Woman" is the only known surviving MkII performance of the song.

Live in Montreux 69 was first issued as a limited edition digipak (Sonic Zoom PUR 207D) under the title Kneel & Pray in 2004.

Track listing
All songs written by Ritchie Blackmore, Ian Gillan, Roger Glover, Jon Lord and Ian Paice except where indicated.

Personnel
 Ritchie Blackmore – guitar
 Ian Gillan – vocals, percussion
 Roger Glover – bass, backing vocals
 Jon Lord – organ, keyboards, backing vocals
 Ian Paice – drums, percussion

References 

2006 live albums
Deep Purple live albums